The 2021–22 Basketbol Süper Ligi was the 56th season of the Basketball Super League (Turkish: Basketbol Süper Ligi), the top-level professional club men's basketball league in Turkey.

Teams
On 2 May 2021, Merkezefendi Bld. Denizli Basket was promoted to the BSL as the champion of the Turkish Basketball First League. It will be their first season in the BSL. Semt77 Yalovaspor promoted to the BSL for the first time in club history as winners of the TBL play-offs.

OGM Ormanspor and Lokman Hekim Fethiye Belediyespor were relegated after finishing in the last two spots for 2020–21 Basketbol Süper Ligi.

Venues

Personnel and sponsorship

Head coaching changes

Regular season

League table

Positions by round

Results

Playoffs
Quarterfinals were played best-of-three format (1–1–1), semifinals and finals were played in a best-of-five format (2–2–1).

Bracket

Quarterfinals

|}

Semifinals

|}

Finals

|}

Statistical leaders

| width=50% valign=top |

Points

|}

|}

| width=50% valign=top |

Assists

|}

|}
Source: BSL Stats

Awards
All official awards of the 2021–22 Basketbol Süper Ligi.

Season awards

MVP of the Round

Turkish clubs in European competitions

References

External links
Official Site
TBLStat.net Historical Data

Turkish Basketball Super League seasons
Turkish
1